Whittlesea may mean:
 Whittlesea, Victoria, a town some 40 km north of Melbourne
 City of Whittlesea, the local government area that contains it
 Whittlesey in Cambridgeshire, England used to be known as Whittlesea
 Whittlesea railway station serves Whittlesey
 Whittlesea, Eastern Cape, a rural town in the Eastern Cape Province of South Africa

See also
Whittlesey (disambiguation)